Juliet Camilla Frankland  (née Brown, 30 January 1929 – 9 June 2013), was a British botanist and mycologist, and "a world expert on fungi".

Early life
She was born Juliet Camilla Brown on 30 January 1929 at High Barn Eaves, Effingham, Dorking, Surrey, the younger daughter of Walter Henry Brown (1893/4–1956), a Ministry of Works civil servant, and his wife, Gerda Lois Brown, née Grenside (1885–1961), an artist.

She earned a bachelor's degree and PhD from Royal Holloway, University of London.

Career
In 1956, she started her career, working for the Nature Conservancy (later part of the Natural Environment Research Council) as a mycologist at Merlewood, Grange-over-Sands, Lancashire.  This later became the Institute of Terrestrial Ecology.

In 1969, Frankland was elected as a fellow of the Linnean Society.

Frankland was president of the British Mycological Society (BMS) in 1995.

Personal life
On 3 June 1959, she married (Edward) Raven Percy Frankland (1918–1997), a farmer from Ravenstonedale, near Kirkby Stephen, Westmorland, the son of  scientist and novelist Edward Percy Frankland, and grandson of the chemist Sir Edward Frankland.

They lived at Bowberhead, a farmhouse a few miles from Ravenstonedale, and did not have any children.

Later life
In 1997, her husband Raven Frankland died suddenly, and she was left to run the estate alone. Her sister, Dame Gillian Brown, a retired diplomat, and the UK's ambassador to Norway, 1981 to 1983, moved to Bowberhead to help, but died unexpectedly in 1999.

Frankland suffered severe depression, and moved into Stobars Hall, a care home in Kirkby Stephen, where she died on 9 June 2013 from dementia and cardiovascular disease.

References

1929 births
2013 deaths
Alumni of Royal Holloway, University of London
People from Dorking
British mycologists
British women scientists
20th-century British botanists
Women mycologists
Juliet
British Mycological Society
Fellows of the Linnean Society of London
Deaths from dementia in England